Ottavio Accoramboni (1549 – 23 May 1625) was a Roman Catholic prelate who served as Archbishop of Urbino (1621–1623), Apostolic Nuncio to Portugal (1614–1620), and Bishop of Fossombrone (1579–1610).

Biography
Ottavio Accoramboni was born in Rome in the first months of 1549, into a family of Gubbio. He studied  at the Roman College by the Jesuits and at the University of Padua. His younger sister, Vittoria, married in 1573 Francesco Peretti, a nephew of Cardinal Montalto, who supported the ecclesiastic career of Ottavio. On 15 May 1579 he was appointed bishop of Fossombrone in the Duchy of Urbino. His episcopal consecration followed on 8 June in the Sistine Chapel by the hands of cardinal Benedetto Lomellini.
He remained unrelated to the bloody events which involved his sister Vittoria. Ottavio resignated from his bishopric in 1610 and returned to live in Rome.

On 4 June 1614, he was appointed Apostolic Nuncio to Portugal. In Portugal Ottavio supported the action of the Jesuits in the Far East, and introduced the cult of Charles Borromeo and Frances of Rome: in particular on 27 June 1616 he organized a procession by boats from Aldeia Galega to Lisbon in honor of Saint Charles. The other main effort of Ottavio was to defend the interests of the Church and in particular he opposed the law that required a permit of the king for the ecclesiastics to buy real estates. To sanction violations of the Church's jurisdiction, on 27 June 1617 he imposed a general interdict in Portugal, which was left only on 30 May of the following year after the intervention of Rome.

On 4 June 1620 Vincenzo Landinelli was appointed as Nuncio in his place, but Ottavio remained in Portugal until the end of 1622.
On 17 May 1621, he had been appointed Archbishop of Urbino, however he resigned in 1623 for health problems. He died in Rome on 23 May 1625, and he was buried in the church of San Gregorio al Celio. On about 1672 his relatives moved his tomb to the new erected family chapel in Sant'Andrea delle Fratte.

Episcopal succession

References 

17th-century Italian Roman Catholic archbishops
Bishops appointed by Pope Gregory XIII
Bishops appointed by Pope Paul V
Bishops appointed by Pope Gregory XV
Apostolic Nuncios to Portugal
1549 births
1625 deaths